Johan Andersson (21 February 1889 – 1 July 1965) was a Swedish wrestler. He competed in the light heavyweight event at the 1912 Summer Olympics.

References

1889 births
1965 deaths
Olympic wrestlers of Sweden
Wrestlers at the 1912 Summer Olympics
Swedish male sport wrestlers
Sportspeople from Gothenburg